The Inner Harbor is a historic seaport, tourist attraction, and landmark of the city of Baltimore, Maryland. It was described by the Urban Land Institute in 2009 as "the model for post-industrial waterfront redevelopment around the world". The Inner Harbor is located at the mouth of Jones Falls, creating the wide and short northwest branch of the Patapsco River.  The district includes any water west of a line drawn between the foot of President Street and the American Visionary Art Museum.

The name "Inner Harbor" is used not just for the water but for the surrounding area of the city, with approximate street boundaries of President Street to the east, Lombard Street to the north, Greene Street to the west, and Key Highway on the south. The harbor is within walking distance of Oriole Park at Camden Yards and M&T Bank Stadium. A water taxi connects passengers to Fells Point, Canton, and Fort McHenry.

History

While Baltimore has been a major U.S. seaport since the 18th century, the historically shallow water of the Inner Harbor (prior to manipulation through dredging) was not conducive to large ships or heavy industry. These were concentrated in Locust Point, Fell's Point, and Canton.

In the mid-20th century, Baltimore suffered from the economic decline of restructuring common to many industrial cities in the United States. Old harbors were abandoned with the arrival of container ships after World War II. Later, the old harbors were adapted as focal points to reconnect cities with their waterfronts, and develop public spaces, tourism, business, and housing.

During the 1940s, John H. Threadgill, the head of the Steamship Trade Association, initiated a study for a cross-harbor bridge. A bridge across the Inner Harbor of Baltimore was one idea that was discussed frequently. In his capacity as head of the association, Threadgill ultimately recommended that the idea for a cross-harbor bridge be abandoned, due to the fact that Baltimore relied heavily on a shipping trade and fears that the bridge would negatively impede the flow of shipping traffic at the Port of Baltimore. Threadgill was named head of Baltimore's Port Commission during the 1950s.

In the 1950s, economic changes ended both the freight and passenger use of the Inner Harbor, such as the Old Bay Line's steamers. Rotting warehouses and piers were eventually torn down and replaced by open, grass-covered parkland that was used for recreational purposes and occasional large events.

The waterfront was gradually transformed with award-winning parks and plazas surrounded by office buildings, hotels and leisure attractions, which reversed the city's decline and became a model for urban renaissance in cities around the world. The renewal of Baltimore's Inner Harbor area began with the adoption of the  Charles Center project by the City Council and Mayor Thomas D'Alesandro in March 1958. Between 1958 and 1965, Baltimore renewed the center of its business district by rebuilding Charles Center with office buildings, hotels, and retail shops.

At the beginning of mayor Theodore R. McKeldin's second term in 1963, the redevelopment program was expanded to include  surrounding the Inner Harbor. Corporate headquarters and hotels were built around the shoreline of the Inner Harbor. A public park and promenade were added for leisure activity and community gatherings.

On July 4, 1976, following the rendezvous of Tall Ships in New York for the U.S. Bicentennial, eight ships from other nations visited Baltimore, where they attracted a huge number of tourists. This interest helped spur the development of other tourist attractions – including the National Aquarium, Maryland Science Center, and the Harborplace festival marketplace (operated by The Rouse Company), which opened on July 4, 1980. The nearby Baltimore Convention Center and Hyatt Regency Baltimore Hotel added to the services and resulted in population density and visitors.

With the success of the Inner Harbor in the 1970s and 1980s, Baltimore became a worldwide tourist destination and model of urban planning and development. It influenced more than 100 other cities and won more than 40 national or international awards, including a citation by the American Institute of Architects in 1984 as "one of the supreme achievements of large-scale urban design and development in U.S. history".

In recent years, the area along the waterfront to the east of the Inner Harbor (in the direction of Fells Point and Little Italy) has been developed with condominiums, retail space, restaurants, and hotels – an ongoing project known as Harbor East.

While little development land remains around the Inner Harbor, the available land has been subject to many plans, which have not been realized. Recently completed projects include mixed-use developments incorporating office space, street-level retail, and condominiums, as well as hotel projects such as the Ritz Carlton Residences, a condominium project on Key Highway at the southeast corner of the Inner Harbor.

In September 2003, the Inner Harbor area was flooded by Hurricane Isabel. The Baltimore World Trade Center remained closed for a month, but all the other buildings were saved from flooding by the Inner Harbor development controls, which were created by the master developer team of Charles Center-Inner Harbor Management, Inc.

In March 2004, a water taxi capsized during a storm on the Northwest Branch of the Patapsco River near Fort McHenry. While occurring over a mile downstream of the Inner Harbor, the accident was associated with the Inner Harbor by news reports and casual observers. Five passengers died in the accident, which the National Transportation Safety Board determined was caused when the small pontoon-style vessel encountered unpredictable strong winds and waves.

Attractions

Museums
American Visionary Art Museum
Baltimore Public Works Museum (opened 1982; closed 2010)
Baltimore Museum of Industry
Civil War Museum at President Street Station
Geppi's Entertainment Museum (opened 2006; closed 2018)
Jewish Museum of Maryland at Lloyd Street Synagogue
National Museum of Dentistry
Port Discovery Children's Museum (on the site of the historic Baltimore Fishmarket)
Reginald F. Lewis Museum of Maryland African American History & Culture
Ripley's Believe It or Not! Odditorium  (opened 2012; closed 2020)
Sports Legends Museum at Camden Yards (opened 2005; closed 2015)

Ships

Historic Ships in Baltimore:
US Coast Guard Cutter WHCEC-37 – last fighting ship still afloat that survived the attack on Pearl Harbor
 – Tench-class submarine; last ship to sink enemy vessel in World War II
Lightship Chesapeake
Seven Foot Knoll Lighthouse
 – only Civil War-era ship still afloat
Vessels on active/reserve status:
  – US Navy Aviation Logistics Support (roll-on/roll-off) container ship
Former vessels
  – US Navy hospital ship (in Baltimore through March 2013)

Entertainment venues

Sports
Camden Yards Sports Complex
Baltimore Grand Prix (street race for Indycar and American Le Mans Series)
Oriole Park at Camden Yards (home of the Baltimore Orioles)
M&T Bank Stadium (home of the Baltimore Ravens; formerly known as PSINet Stadium and then as Ravens Stadium)
Sports Legends Museum at Camden Yards (closed 2015)
Babe Ruth birthplace and museum

Concert halls and arenas
Baltimore Convention Center
Royal Farms Arena (formerly known as the Civic Center and previously as Baltimore Arena and 1st Mariner Arena)
Pier Six Pavilion
Power Plant Live! (a collection of bars and clubs that includes Rams Head Live!)

Notable architecture
 National Katyń Memorial
 Bnai Israel – an active Moorish Revival synagogue
The Lloyd Street Synagogue, just up the street, is a museum. Between the two synagogue buildings is the Jewish Museum of Maryland.

Other attractions

National Aquarium in Baltimore
Harborplace and the Gallery (which includes a Ripley's Believe It or Not! museum)
Maryland Science Center
The Pratt Street Power Plant (containing Barnes & Noble, Hard Rock Cafe, and the original ESPN Zone, which closed in June 2010; in the late 1980s, contained an indoor Victorian era "fun house"-themed Six Flags amusement park)
Top of the World at the Baltimore World Trade Center
Holocaust Memorial
Columbus Center, home of the University of Maryland Biotechnology Institute
Lockwood Place
Baltimore Visitor Center
Lloyd Street Synagogue, the third-oldest synagogue in the United States, now a museum
McKeldin Square

Free speech

As a central and busy part of Baltimore, the Inner Harbor has been the site of much political and artistic activity. The city is involved in ongoing disputes over free speech in the area. One early conflict concerned marchers for gay rights, whose permit was revoked by the city. (The city announced that only five or fewer people could march, and that they could not carry signs.)

The Rouse Company, which began operating Harborplace in 1980, has long been in conflict with street performers. The company regulates performances, and has often been accused of suppressing free speech. These disputes came to a head in 2002–2003, when two events triggered a lawsuit against the city.

ACLU lawsuit
On October 21, 2002, street performer Jerry Rowan was banned from the area for making an "insensitive" joke. Discussing the then-current D.C. sniper case, Rowan said: "I was driving downtown this morning, and on the radio I heard that they've finally come out with a composite of the sniper, so there should be an arrest forthcoming. Apparently, he's a white guy that speaks Spanish and looks like he's Arab." Police officers overheard the joke and reported it to Rouse. The company had previously sent a letter to Rowan admonishing him for "off-color humor", as well as "lack of respect for program administrators". After this report, the company banned him from the area.

On April 4, 2003, a police officer asked Baltimore's Women in Black to disband. The group had (and has) gathered in McKeldin Square every Friday since September 11, 2002.

Rowan and the Women in Black filed suit against the city of Baltimore on October 7, 2003, arguing their right of free speech. They were assisted by attorney Rajeev Goyle on behalf of the American Civil Liberties Union.

The lawsuit was resolved in 2013 in a settlement that resulted in a consent decree with the city, creating "instant permits" for spontaneous demonstrations and waived permit requirements for groups of 30 people or less. The negotiations with the ACLU, the city, The Rouse Company, and The Waterfront Partnership in the settlement yielded other specific results in favor of free speech activities. McKeldin Square, Rash Field, Kaufman Pavilion, the area West of the Visitor Center, and Area 10 were all designated as official free-speech zones.  Additionally, the settlement required the City of Baltimore to pay the attorney's fees for the ACLU.

Elsewhere, police enforce rules against protest. On May 21, 2011, teacher Bruce Friedrich was threatened with arrest while handing out animal rights pamphlets. On September 18, 2011, police arrested artist Mark Chase for selling his paintings "in or near" the Inner Harbor amphitheater. "Your constitutional rights have nothing to do with the law," said the arresting officer when Chase objected on First Amendment grounds.

See also
 Mr. Trash Wheel – a vessel that removes trash from Inner Harbor

References

External links

 
Landmarks in Baltimore
Neighborhoods in Baltimore
Redeveloped ports and waterfronts in the United States
Ports and harbors of Maryland
Tourist attractions in Baltimore
Downtown Baltimore
Historic American Engineering Record in Baltimore
Patapsco River